Wessells Root Cellar is a small brick structure near Hallwood, Accomack County, Virginia. The root cellar was built sometime after 1768 by William Vessells as a structure separate from the main house, which burned in 1937.  The cellar is of fine quality and has remained in the Wessells family for more than two hundred years. A decorative header pattern in the gable using overfired brick is an unusual detail.

See also 
 National Register of Historic Places listings in Accomack County, Virginia
 Pence-Carmichael Farm, Barn and Root Cellar

References

External links
 Wessel's Root Cellar, State Routes 701 & 692 vicinity, Hallwood, Accomack County, VA at the Historic American Buildings Survey (HABS)

National Register of Historic Places in Accomack County, Virginia
Agricultural buildings and structures on the National Register of Historic Places in Virginia
Historic American Buildings Survey in Virginia
1768 establishments in Virginia
Buildings and structures in Accomack County, Virginia
Semi-subterranean structures
Buildings and structures completed in 1768